The Marine Command is the naval infantry element of the Islamic Republic of Iran Navy (IRIN).

Personnel 
During the Iran–Iraq War, Iranian marines were divided in three battalions (approximately 1,500 troops): one stationed at Khorramshahr and the other two at Bandar Abbas, one of which detached to Kharg Island.
According to the 2020 edition of the Military Balance published by IISS, the size of the marines is about 2,600. An unclassified report published by the American Office of Naval Intelligence in 2017, concludes that "[t]he IRIN touts its naval infantry training program as being very selective, accepting only the most qualified individuals".

Units

See also 

 Sepah Navy Special Force, naval infantry of the IRGC

References

External links 
 Iranian Naval Infantry at GlobalSecurity.org

Marine corps units and formations
Islamic Republic of Iran Navy